Portrait of Francisco da Moncada is a 1634 oil on canvas portrait of Francisco de Moncada by Anthony van Dyck, commissioned simultaneously with the equestrian portrait of the same subject now in the Louvre. Since at least 1720 it has been in the Kunsthistorisches Museum in Vienna.

References

1634 paintings
Paintings in the collection of the Kunsthistorisches Museum
Moncada